Frk. Vildkat is a 1942 Danish family film directed by Lau Lauritzen Jr. and Alice O'Fredericks.

Cast
Marguerite Viby as Dolly Hansen
Ebbe Rode as Peter Bruun
Gerda Neumann as Louise Holm
Ib Schønberg as Peters onkel / Oberst Hannibal Brixbye
Maria Garland as Peters tante / Oberstinde Caroline Brixbye
Poul Reichhardt as Herbert Rung
Jon Iversen as Hushovmester Bølner
Sigurd Langberg as Teaterdirektøren
Olaf Ussing as Teaterinstruktør Hovmann
Knud Heglund as Redaktør Hans Bruun
Per Gudmann as Freddy
Stig Lommer as Joakim
Tove Arni as Hushjælp hos Peter Bruun
Henry Nielsen as Stationsforstander
Vera Gebuhr as Louises vendinde

External links

1942 films
1942 drama films
Danish drama films
1940s Danish-language films
Danish black-and-white films
Films directed by Lau Lauritzen Jr.
Films directed by Alice O'Fredericks
Films scored by Sven Gyldmark